David Russell Leisure (born November 16, 1950) is an American actor.  He played Charley Dietz in the sitcom Empty Nest from 1988 to 1995 and fictional automotive "pitch man" Joe Isuzu in a series of North American television commercials for Isuzu from 1986 to 1990, and again from 1999 to 2001.

Early life
Leisure was born in San Diego and attended San Diego State University.

Career
Leisure moved to Los Angeles after graduating.  His first acting job was a minor role in Airplane! (1980) as a Hare Krishna.  He had been roommates with the star, Robert Hays, in college but attributed his casting to his willingness to shave his head.  After a period of hardship, in which he lived in his car, he found work as a commercial pitchman, including a series of commercials for Bell Atlantic. Della Femina Travisano & Partners cast him as Joe Isuzu because they believe he could "lie like a pro".  The character made over-the-top claims and obvious lies about Isuzu cars in a series of commercials throughout the 1980s.  The character's popularity led to a costarring role as Charley Dietz on the television series Empty Nest.  His Joe Isuzu character was brought back in 1999 and continued through 2001.  Other roles include Roger Wilkes on the CBS daytime drama The Young and the Restless and, as of July 2010, a recurring role as Salem District Attorney Charles Woods on Days of Our Lives.

Roles
Additional credits include Sabrina the Teenage Witch, One on One, V.I.P., Diagnosis: Murder, The Parent 'Hood, Honey, I Shrunk the Kids: The TV Show, For Your Love, Caroline in the City, The Wayans Bros., Touched by an Angel, Lois & Clark: The New Adventures of Superman, Renegade, The Golden Girls, Married... with Children, ALF, 227, T. J. Hooker, The Equalizer, Falcon Crest, Sledge Hammer!, Nurses, The Brady Bunch Movie, and ''Power Rangers Wild Force.

Filmography

Film

Television

References

External links

1950 births
American male film actors
American male soap opera actors
American male television actors
American male voice actors
20th-century American male actors
21st-century American male actors
Living people
Male actors from San Diego
San Diego State University alumni
People from El Cajon, California